This is a list of newspapers in Tokelau.

Te Vakai
Te Ulug Talafau
Te Moa Moa

References

 
Mass media in Tokelau
Tokelau
Tokelau-related lists
Lists of organisations based in Tokelau